Lenka Gazdíková is a retired Slovak football goalkeeper, who is now a team manager of the  Slovakia women's national football team.

She was a member of the Slovakian national team.

References

1986 births
Living people
Slovak women's footballers
Expatriate women's footballers in the Czech Republic
Footballers from Bratislava
Slovak expatriate footballers
Slovak expatriate sportspeople in the Czech Republic
ŠK Slovan Bratislava (women) players
Women's association football goalkeepers
AC Sparta Praha (women) players
Slovakia women's international footballers
Czech Women's First League players